Caerphilly Castle is a member of the GWR 4073 Class built in 1923.

In service
The lead locomotive of its class, after a brief period of running-in service, between April and October 1924, the locomotive was exhibited at the British Empire Exhibition, which was held at Wembley Park, Wembley, north-west London. Its first shed allocation was Old Oak Common. Its August 1950 shed allocation was Bath Road, Bristol. Its last shed allocation was Cardiff Canton in March 1959.

Preservation
Withdrawn in May 1960, it was made part of the National Collection. Refurbished for display purposes at Swindon Works, on 2 June 1961 she was formally handed over by Dr Richard Beeching at Paddington Station to the director of the Science Museum. Pickfords hauled the engine to the museum in Kensington, using Scammell Constructor units on Sunday 4 June. She was then placed on display in the new land transport gallery.

After the Science Museum decided to refurbish the gallery into the Making the Modern World, it was decided to move the locomotive to Swindon Steam Railway Museum. After a period on display at National Railway Museum, York, she moved to Swindon on the museum's opening.

References

Notes

External links

YouTube video of handover and transportation to the Science Museum, June 1961

4073
Railway locomotives introduced in 1923
4073
Standard gauge steam locomotives of Great Britain